Maher Bouallegue is a retired Paralympian athlete from Tunisia competed mainly in category T13 800m to 10000m events.

He is a seven-times Paralympic medalist, is an African record holder, and trained with the Tunisian Federation of Sports for the Disabled team based at Tunis.

Achievements
Maher competed in two Paralympics; firstly in the 2000 Summer Paralympics where he was undefeated in the 800m, 1500m and 5000m, taking home three gold medals.

Four years later, in the 2004 Summer Paralympics, he attempted to defend his titles and add the 10000m title. He won three golds but missed out in the 800m being beaten into the silver medal by Abel Avila of Spain.

References

Paralympic athletes of Tunisia
Athletes (track and field) at the 2000 Summer Paralympics
Athletes (track and field) at the 2004 Summer Paralympics
Paralympic gold medalists for Tunisia
Paralympic silver medalists for Tunisia
Living people
Medalists at the 2000 Summer Paralympics
Medalists at the 2004 Summer Paralympics
Tunisian male middle-distance runners
Tunisian male long-distance runners
Year of birth missing (living people)
Paralympic medalists in athletics (track and field)
Visually impaired middle-distance runners
Visually impaired long-distance runners
Paralympic middle-distance runners
Paralympic long-distance runners
21st-century Tunisian people